The General Motors G platform (also called G-body) designation was used for three different automobile platforms.
 1969–1972 GM G platform (RWD)
 1982–1988 GM G platform (RWD)
 1995–2011 GM G platform (FWD)

G